The Old Garden is a 2006 South Korean film, based on the best-selling novel of the same name by the author Hwang Sok-yong. It was written and directed by Im Sang-soo and starred Ji Jin-hee, Yum Jung-ah, and Youn Yuh-jung.

The plot of the film involves a couple during the turbulent political landscape in early 1980s South Korea, and the events surrounding the Gwangju Massacre.

Plot
Hyun-woo (Ji Jin-hee) is released from prison after spending 17 years behind bars. During his college days he was involved in the student-led anti-government protests that swept across Korea in the early 1980s. Now that he is finally free, Hyun-woo travels back to the town where he spent a few precious months immediately prior to his arrest.

Seventeen years ago, Hyun-woo fled into the rural area of Korea, hiding from the government that was trying to quash his anti-government group. He found sanctuary in the home of Han Yun-hee (Yum Jung-ah). She was a former sympathizer to the anti-government cause, but now living a modest life as a teacher in a small rural community. The couple quickly became intimate, Hyun-woo able to provide the spark that was missing from Yun-hee's simple life.

Unfortunately, while Hyun-woo was still hiding in Yun-hee's home, he learned that most of his fellow anti-government protesters were captured and imprisoned. Even though the government now has Hyun-woo high on their wanted list, he feels ashamed that he is living peacefully, while his friends are imprisoned. Thus, he makes the difficult decision to leave Yun-hee and go back to the movement centered in Seoul. What he would later learn is that he left behind the sole person that would stay faithful to him throughout his 17-year imprisonment and also the woman that was carrying his baby.

Awards and nominations
2007 Baeksang Arts Awards
 Best Actress - Yum Jung-ah

2008 Asian Film Awards
 Nomination – Best Screenplay - Im Sang-soo
 Nomination – Best Editing - Lee Eun-soo

References

External links
 
 
 
 The Old Garden: a review at The Korea Society

2006 films
2000s romance films
South Korean romance films
Films based on Korean novels
Films directed by Im Sang-soo
Lotte Entertainment films
2000s Korean-language films
South Korean political films
2000s political films
2000s South Korean films